Zonoepalpus is a genus of parasitic flies in the family Tachinidae. There are at least two described species in Zonoepalpus.

Species
These two species belong to the genus Zonoepalpus:
 Zonoepalpus argentinensis Blanchard, 1941
 Zonoepalpus testaceus (Robineau-Desvoidy, 1830)

References

Further reading

 
 
 
 

Tachinidae
Articles created by Qbugbot